Aquinas High School is a Roman Catholic high school located in La Crosse, Wisconsin. The school is part of La Crosse Aquinas Catholic Schools and is operated by the Diocese of La Crosse.

In 2008, Aquinas High School was named a national Blue Ribbon School.

History
The high school was dedicated on September 2, 1928, in honor of Thomas Aquinas by Bishop Alexander Joseph McGavick of the Diocese of La Crosse. The first graduating class of 1929 consisted of four girls. The high school was originally staffed by diocesan clergy and the Franciscan Sisters of Perpetual Adoration.

Diocesan Bishop John Joseph Paul, an Aquinas alumnus of the class of 1935, set aside some rooms at Aquinas High School for the Aquinas Middle School in 1992. In 1997, the Bishop Burke Hall addition to Aquinas High School was dedicated in honor of Bishop Raymond Leo Burke, now the Prefect of the Apostolic Signatura in the Vatican City and a former religion teacher at Aquinas High School.

School crest 
The Aquinas High School crest, designed in 1942, first appeared in the yearbook, the Trumpet, and on the 1943 class rings. It features the cross in a central and prominent position on the crest, reflecting the importance of the faith and redemption it symbolizes; ΧΡ, the first two letters of the Greek word for Christ, signifying that the life of a Christian should be centered around Christ; the fleur-de-lis, the symbol of sanctity and virtue, symbolizing God, man's final end, and the Blessed Virgin, model of virtue; a lamp of learning and books, as symbols of knowledge and learning; a laurel, symbolizing reward; and lilies of the valley, symbolizing humility.

Sports 
The school competes in the Mississippi Valley Conference and the WIAA with baseball, basketball, cross country, dance, football, golf, gymnastics, skiing, soccer, softball, swimming, tennis, track and field, volleyball, and wrestling teams. The school's hockey team is a co-op team composed of students from Aquinas, Holmen High School, Luther High School, and Coulee Christian High School.

WIAA state champion titles:

 Alpine ski: 2000
 Boys baseball: 2017, 2021
 Boys basketball: 2003, 2008, 2011, 2013
 Boys Track & Field: 2019, 2021
 Boys Cross country: 2007, 2018, 2019, 2020
 Football: 2007, 2021 2022
 Girls basketball: 2018, 2019
 Girls golf: 2017
 Girls soccer: 2015

Affiliation 
 Aquinas Catholic Schools (formerly Coulee Catholic School)
 National Catholic Educational Association (NCEA)
 Greater La Crosse Area Chamber of Commerce
 Mississippi Valley Conference (MVC)
 Wisconsin Interscholastic Athletic Association (WIAA)
 Wisconsin Independent Schools Athletic Association (WISAA)
 Central Wisconsin Catholic Conference (CWCC)
 North Central Accrediting Association

Principals
 Father Hilary Leuther, 1928–1936
 Father Joseph Kundinger, 1936–1940, 1946–1951
 Father John Prizl, 1940–1946
 Father Alfred Hebert, 1951–1952
 Father Robert Hansen, 1952–1960
 Father Richard Rossiter, 1960–1964
 Father James O'Connell, 1964–1972
 Father Robert Altmann, 1972–1990
 James Vail, 1990–1997
 Jeffrey Brengman, 1997–2001
 Father John McHugh, 2001–2002
 Joan Leonard, 2002–2004
 Philip Hahn, 2004–2006
 Patrick Burkhart, 2006–2007
 Ted Knutson, 2007–2016
 Denise Ring, 2016–2022
 Andrew Bradley, 2022–present

Notable faculty
Ann Walsh Bradley, Wisconsin Supreme Court justice, former religion teacher at Aquinas High School
Raymond Leo Burke, teacher of religion at Aquinas High School prior to becoming bishop, archbishop, and cardinal.
George Albert Hammes, teacher at Aquinas High School prior to becoming bishop

Notable alumni

Sylvester G. Clements, 1954, former member of the Wisconsin State Assembly
Charles Dierkop, actor, attended Aquinas High School
Steve Doyle, member of the Wisconsin State Assembly
Charles E. Knoblauch, former member of the Iowa House of Representatives
Bronson Koenig, basketball player
Robert E. Kreutz, composer, 1940
Paul Marcotte, 1945, businessman and former member of Kentucky House of Representatives
John Medinger, former mayor of La Crosse, Wisconsin, former member of Wisconsin State Assembly, 1966
John Oestreicher, 1954, former member of the Wisconsin State Assembly
John Joseph Paul, 1935 graduate of Aquinas High School who served as Bishop of the Diocese of La Crosse, 1985–1994
John Rusche, 1969, physician and former member of the Idaho House of Representatives
Ed Servais, head coach of the Creighton Bluejays baseball team
Jim Temp, Green Bay Packers

See also
La Crosse Central High School
La Crosse Logan High School
Onalaska High School
Holmen High School
West Salem High School
Luther High School

References

 Aquinas High School 2003 Alumni Directory 75th Anniversary 1928–2003

External links
Aquinas High School La Crosse
Diocese of La Crosse
Franciscan Sisters of Perpetual Adoration La Crosse
Dan Simmons. "The Archivist: Aquinas alum collects 80 years of school's history in one office," La Crosse Tribune, September 21, 2006.

Roman Catholic Diocese of La Crosse
Catholic secondary schools in Wisconsin
Educational institutions established in 1928
Buildings and structures in La Crosse, Wisconsin
Schools in La Crosse County, Wisconsin
1928 establishments in Wisconsin